The Vârghiș is a right tributary of the river Cormoș in Romania. It discharges into the Cormoș near Tălișoara.

References

Rivers of Romania
Rivers of Covasna County
Rivers of Harghita County